John Michael Kume (May 19, 1926 – November 26, 2012) was an American professional baseball player. He was a right-handed pitcher who debuted with the Kansas City Athletics during the  season.

He made his Major League debut at age 29 after spending eight seasons in the Athletics' farm system, signing with them in 1948 when they were still based in Philadelphia. As a Major Leaguer, he allowed 35 hits, 15 bases on balls, and 21 earned runs in 23⅔ innings, striking out seven.

His pro career lasted 12 seasons (and 734 minor league games), all in the Athletics' organization.

References

1926 births
2012 deaths
Baseball players from West Virginia
Buffalo Bisons (minor league) players
Columbus Jets players
Fayetteville A's players
Kansas City Athletics players
Lincoln A's players
Little Rock Travelers players
Major League Baseball pitchers
Martinsville A's players
Ottawa A's players
Portland Beavers players
Sacramento Solons players
Savannah A's players
Savannah Indians players
Welch Miners players
People from McDowell County, West Virginia